This is a list of archives in France.

Archives in France 
 Archives du Féminisme
 Archives nationales (France)
 Centre des Archives diplomatiques
 Defence Historical Service

Departements of France

 Archives départementales de l'Ain
 Archives départementales de l'Aisne
 Archives départementales de l'Allier
 Archives départementales des Alpes-de-Haute-Provence
 Archives départementales des Hautes-Alpes
 Archives départementales des Alpes-Maritimes
 Archives départementales de l'Ardèche
 Archives départementales des Ardennes
 Archives départementales de l'Ariège
 Archives départementales de l'Aube
 Archives départementales de l'Aude
 Archives départementales de l'Aveyron
 Archives départementales des Bouches-du-Rhône
 Archives départementales du Calvados
 Archives departementales du Cantal
 Archives départementales de la Charente
 
 Archives départementales du Cher
 Archives départementales de la Corrèze
 Archives départementales de la Corse-du-Sud
 Archives départementales de la Haute-Corse
 Archives départementales de la Côte-d'Or
 Archives départementales des Côtes-d'Armor
 Archives départementales de la Creuse
 Archives départementales de la Dordogne
 Departmental archives of Doubs
 Archives départementales de la Drôme
 Archives départementales de l'Eure
 Archives départementales d'Eure-et-Loir
 Archives départementales du Finistère
 Archives départementales du Gard
 Archives départementales de la Haute-Garonne
 Archives départementales du Gers
 Archives départementales de la Gironde
 Archives départementales de l'Hérault
 Archives départementales d'Ille-et-Vilaine
 Archives départementales de l'Indre
 Archives départementales d'Indre-et-Loire
 Archives départementales de l'Isère
 Archives départementales du Jura
 Archives départementales des Landes
 Archives départementales de Loir-et-Cher
 Archives départementales de la Loire
 Archives départementales de la Haute-Loire
 Archives départementales de la Loire-Atlantique
 Archives départementales du Loiret
 Archives départementales du Lot
 Archives départementales de Lot-et-Garonne
 Archives départementales de la Lozère
 Archives départementales de Maine-et-Loire
 Archives départementales de la Manche
 Archives départementales de la Marne
 Archives départementales de la Haute-Marne
 Archives départementales de la Mayenne
 Archives départementales de la Meurthe-et-Moselle
 Archives départementales de la Meuse
 Archives départementales du Morbihan
 Archives départementales de la Moselle
 Archives départementales de la Nièvre
 Archives départementales du Nord
 Archives départementales de l'Oise
 Archives départementales de l'Orne
 Archives départementales du Pas-de-Calais
 Archives départementales du Puy-de-Dôme
 Archives départementales des Pyrénées-Atlantiques
 Archives départementales des Hautes-Pyrénées
 Archives départementales des Pyrénées-Orientales
 Archives départementales du Bas-Rhin
 Archives départementales du Haut-Rhin
 Service d'archives du département du Rhône et de la métropole de Lyon
 Archives départementales de la Haute-Saone
 Archives départementales de Saône-et-Loire
 Archives départementales de la Sarthe
 Archives départementales de la Savoie
 Archives départementales de la Haute-Savoie
 Archives de Paris
 Archives départementales de Seine-Maritime
 Archives départementales de la Seine-Maritime
 Archives départementales de Seine-et-Marne
 Archives départementales des Yvelines
 Archives départementales des Deux-Sèvres
 Archives départementales de la Somme
 Archives départementales du Tarn
 Archives départementales de Tarn-et-Garonne
 Archives départementales du Var
 Archives départementales de Vaucluse
 Archives départementales de la Vendée
 Archives départementales de la Vienne
 Archives départementales de la Haute-Vienne
 Archives départementales des Vosges
 Archives départementales de l'Yonne
 Archives départementales du Territoire de Belfort
 Archives départementales de l'Essonne
 Archives départementales des Hauts-de-Seine
 Archives départementales de la Seine-Saint-Denis
 Archives départementales du Val-de-Marne
 Archives départementales du Val-d'Oise
 Archives départementales de la Guadeloupe
 Archives départementales de la Martinique
 Archives départementales de la Guyane
 Archives départementales de La Réunion
 Archives départementales de Mayotte

See also 

 List of archives
 List of museums in France
 Culture of France

References

Further reading

External links 

 
Archives
Archives
France